Walter Watkins Bahan (November 6, 1860 – March 11, 1916) was an American lawyer and politician from New York City.

Life 
Bahan was born on November 6, 1860 in New York City, New York, the son of Thomas W. Bahan and Mary Jane Watkins. His father was a prominent Greenwich Village physician and surgeon who was active in relief works in the Parks Barracks during the American Civil War.

Bahan began attending the New York University School of Law in 1883 and graduated from there with an LL.B. in 1885. He then began working as a lawyer and real estate broker. In 1892, he was elected to the New York State Assembly as a Democrat, representing the New York County 9th District. He served in the Assembly in 1893. In the Assembly, he submitted bills to prevent the use of barbed wire in division fences, amend the Penal Code in relation to publishing libelous material, and amending the Penal Code to provide a person inducing another to commit a crime may not plead that the act was performed to obtain evidence of a person's criminal character with reference to conviction.

Bahan later moved to Queens and established a home and law office in Flushing, and then to Long Island City. He continued to work as a lawyer until a few days before his death. In 1884, he married Janet F. Halliday. They had one daughter, Mrs. Janet M. Lovey.

Bahan died at his home in Richmond Hill on March 11, 1916. He was buried in Green-Wood Cemetery.

References

External links 

 The Political Graveyard

1860 births
1916 deaths
New York University School of Law alumni
19th-century American lawyers
20th-century American lawyers
Lawyers from Queens, New York
Politicians from Manhattan
19th-century American politicians
Democratic Party members of the New York State Assembly
People from Flushing, Queens
People from Long Island City, Queens
People from Richmond Hill, Queens
Burials at Green-Wood Cemetery